Thomas S. Casey (April 6, 1832 – March 1, 1891) was an American politician and judge.

Casey was born in Jefferson County, Illinois and sent to the public schools. He graduated from McKendree College and then studied law. In 1851, Casey was admitted to the Illinois bar. He lived in Mount Vernon, Illinois. In 1860, he was elected state's attorney. Casey served in the Union Army during the American Civil War and was commissioned a colonel. From 1864 to 1868, Casey again served as state's attorney. From 1870 to 1872, he served in the Illinois House of Representatives and was a Democrat. Casey served in the Illinois Senate from 1872 to 1876.Casey then served on the Illinois Appellate Court from 1879 to 1885. Case then moved to Springfield, Illinois, where he practiced law. He died in Springfield, Illinois, from pneumonia. His father was Zadok Casey who served as Governor of Illinois.

Notes

1832 births
1891 deaths
People from Mount Vernon, Illinois
Politicians from Springfield, Illinois
People of Illinois in the American Civil War
McKendree University alumni
Illinois lawyers
Judges of the Illinois Appellate Court
Democratic Party members of the Illinois House of Representatives
Democratic Party Illinois state senators
19th-century American politicians
19th-century American judges
19th-century American lawyers